Salvatore Rosato (June 6, 1918 – January 12, 1959) was an American football fullback in the National Football League for the Washington Redskins.  He attended Villanova University.

External links
https://web.archive.org/web/20121006163635/http://www.databasefootball.com/players/playerpage.htm?ilkid=ROSATSAL01

1918 births
1959 deaths
Sportspeople from Williamsport, Pennsylvania
American football fullbacks
Players of American football from Pennsylvania
Villanova Wildcats football players
Washington Redskins players